Sparneck is a municipality in Upper Franconia in the district of Hof in Bavaria in Germany.

Location 
The Saxon Saale river flows through this valley in a northerly direction. Towards the east the  877 metre high Waldstein ridge rises, the source of the Saale is on its slopes. It forms the natural boundary with the neighbouring district of Wunsiedel.

History 
Sparneck is first mentioned 1223 with a person from Sparneck family.

References

Hof (district)